Poutiainen is a Finnish surname. Notable people with the surname include:

Matti Poutiainen (1864–1929), Finnish politician
Ari Poutiainen (born 1972), Finnish musician
Tanja Poutiainen (born 1980), Finnish skier
Patrick Poutiainen (born 1991), Finnish footballer
Pertti Poutiainen (1952–1978), Finnish chess master

Finnish-language surnames